Lorenzo Cellerino (born 30 December 1944) is an Italian former sprinter

Biography
He competed in the 1972 Summer Olympics.

Olympic results

National titles
He has won 2 times the team national championship.
1 win in the 4x100 m relay (1969)
1 win in the 4x400 m relay (1973)

References

External links
 

1944 births
Living people
People from Alessandria
Italian male sprinters
Olympic athletes of Italy
Athletes (track and field) at the 1972 Summer Olympics
European Athletics Championships medalists
Mediterranean Games gold medalists for Italy
Athletes (track and field) at the 1971 Mediterranean Games
Mediterranean Games medalists in athletics
Sportspeople from the Province of Alessandria
20th-century Italian people
21st-century Italian people